Sopac may refer to:

 South Pacific Applied Geoscience Commission, an inter-governmental regional organisation
 South Pacific Area (SOPAC), a multinational U.S.-led military command active during World War II
 Southern Pacific Railroad (SoPac), a former American railroad (1865–1996)